ADP-ribosylation factor-like protein 3 is a protein that in humans is encoded by the ARL3 gene.

Function 

ADP-ribosylation factor-like 3 is a member of the ADP-ribosylation factor family of GTP-binding proteins. ARL3 binds guanine nucleotides but lacks ADP-ribosylation factor activity.

Interactions 

ARL3 has been shown to interact with Protein unc-119 homolog.

References

External links

Further reading